Petr Stloukal (born June 18, 1993) is a Czech professional ice hockey player. He is currently an Unrestricted Free Agent after previously playing with HC Keski-Uusimaa in the Finnish Mestis on loan from HIFK.

Stloukal made his Liiga debut playing with HIFK during the 2013–14 Liiga season.

References

External links

 

1993 births
Living people
Chicago Steel players
Czech ice hockey forwards
HIFK (ice hockey) players
Ice hockey people from Brno
Corpus Christi Icerays (WPHL) players
Deggendorfer SC players
Piráti Chomutov players
HC Karlovy Vary players
HK Nitra players
HK 36 Skalica players
Peliitat Heinola players
HC RT Torax Poruba players
Czech expatriate ice hockey players in the United States
Czech expatriate ice hockey players in Germany
Czech expatriate ice hockey players in Slovakia
Czech expatriate ice hockey players in Finland